Croft Mitchell is a hamlet in the parish of Camborne, Cornwall, England.

References

Hamlets in Cornwall